was a Japanese hammer thrower who competed in the 1956 Summer Olympics.

References

1918 births
2011 deaths
Japanese male hammer throwers
Japanese male discus throwers
Olympic male hammer throwers
Olympic athletes of Japan
Athletes (track and field) at the 1956 Summer Olympics
Asian Games gold medalists for Japan
Asian Games gold medalists in athletics (track and field)
Athletes (track and field) at the 1951 Asian Games
Medalists at the 1951 Asian Games
Japan Championships in Athletics winners
20th-century Japanese people
21st-century Japanese people